Eldhose Paul (born 7 November 1996) is an Indian athlete who competes in triple jump. In 2022, he became the first Indian to qualify for the final of the triple jump at the World Athletics Championships. At the 2022 Commonwealth Games, he became the first Indian to win a gold medal in men's triple jump.

References

External links
 

1996 births
Living people
Indian male triple jumpers
People from Ernakulam district
Athletes from Kerala
Athletes (track and field) at the 2022 Commonwealth Games
Commonwealth Games gold medallists for India
Commonwealth Games gold medallists in athletics
Recipients of the Arjuna Award
Medallists at the 2022 Commonwealth Games